Tilton is a town on the Winnipesaukee River in Belknap County, New Hampshire, United States. The population was 3,962 at the 2020 census, up from 3,567 at the 2010 census. It includes the villages of Tilton and Lochmere and part of the village of Winnisquam. Tilton is home to the Tilton School, a private preparatory school.

History 

Originally the southern part of Sanbornton, the present area of Tilton was known as "Sanbornton Bridge" and "Bridge Village". These two names refer to the bridge, built in 1763, that crossed the Winnipesaukee River from Canterbury to Sanbornton and onto what is now Main Street in Tilton. In 1869, Sanbornton Bridge was set off and incorporated as Tilton, named in honor of Nathaniel Tilton (1726–1814), whose great-grandson Charles E. Tilton (1827–1901) was the owner of textile mills and the community's wealthiest citizen. Nathaniel Tilton established an iron foundry and the area's first hotel, the Dexter House. Charles E. Tilton donated many statues to the town, a unique feature, and his estate is now part of the Tilton School. Tilton Hall, his former mansion built in 1861, houses the Lucian Hunt Library. The attached carriage house was renovated in 1980 to become the Helene Grant Daly Art Center.

Charles E. Tilton also donated what is perhaps the most notable landmark in the area, the hilltop Memorial Arch, located in the neighboring town of Northfield, across the Winnipesaukee River from the center of Tilton. The Roman arch replica was built in the late 1800s as a memorial to his ancestors.

Geography
Tilton is drained by the Winnipesaukee River. It is bounded on the east by Silver Lake and Lake Winnisquam.

Tilton is served by Interstate 93, U.S. Route 3, and state routes 11, 132 and 140. Tilton is considered the gateway to the Lakes Region of the state, and a large commercial and retail district has sprung up at the intersection of the five aforementioned routes, just off Exit 20 of I-93. The historic village of Tilton is located a short distance to the west of the new commercial development, on the northern banks of the Winnipesaukee.

Adjacent municipalities
 Sanbornton (north)
 Belmont (east)
 Northfield (south)
 Franklin (west)

Demographics

As of the census of 2010, there were 3,567 people, 1,462 households, and 888 families residing in the town. There were 1,845 housing units, of which 383, or 20.8%, were vacant. 212 of the vacant units were for seasonal or recreational use. The racial makeup of the town was 96.2% white, 0.4% African American, 0.2% Native American, 1.4% Asian, 0.0% Native Hawaiian or Pacific Islander, 0.2% some other race, and 1.7% from two or more races. 1.1% of the population were Hispanic or Latino of any race.

Of the 1,462 households, 25.2% had children under the age of 18 living with them, 46.4% were headed by married couples living together, 9.5% had a female householder with no husband present, and 39.3% were non-families. 30.2% of all households were made up of individuals, and 11.6% were someone living alone who was 65 years of age or older. The average household size was 2.28, and the average family size was 2.83.

In the town, 17.9% of the population were under the age of 18, 7.4% were from 18 to 24, 24.5% from 25 to 44, 30.4% from 45 to 64, and 20.0% were 65 years of age or older. The median age was 45.2 years. For every 100 females, there were 106.2 males. For every 100 females age 18 and over, there were 106.2 males.

For the period 2011–2015, the estimated median annual income for a household was $54,276, and the median income for a family was $59,754. Male full-time workers had a median income of $40,132 versus $36,715 for females. The per capita income for the town was $28,510. 8.3% of the population and 4.6% of families were below the poverty line. 16.6% of the population under the age of 18 and 6.4% of those 65 or older were living in poverty.

Government

In the New Hampshire Senate, Tilton is in the 2nd District, represented by Republican Bob Giuda. On the New Hampshire Executive Council, Tilton is in the 1st District, represented by Republican Joseph Kenney. In the United States House of Representatives, Tilton is in New Hampshire's 1st congressional district, represented by Democrat Chris Pappas.

Notable people 

 John Charles Daly (1914–1991), television personality, network executive, host of What's My Line?, alumnus of Tilton School
 Mary Baker Eddy (1821–1910), founder of Christian Science
 John W. Gowdy (1869–1963), bishop of the Methodist Episcopal Church and Methodist Church
 Jonathan Page (born 1976), American champion cyclocross racer
 Harry Taylor (1862–1930), US Army major general and USACE Chief of Engineer

Sites of interest 
New Hampshire Historical Marker No. 149: Lochmere Archeological District
New Hampshire Historical Marker No. 262: Charles E. Tilton's Legacy

Notes

References

External links
 
 Hall Memorial Library
 New Hampshire Economic and Labor Market Information Bureau Profile
 Tilton-Northfield Arch Trail Travelers Snowmobile Club
 Tilton School

 
Towns in Belknap County, New Hampshire
Towns in New Hampshire
1869 establishments in New Hampshire